The murder of Vladislav Tornovoy happened in Krasnoarmeisky district of Volgograd in the night from 9 May to 10 May 2013 after celebration of Day of Victory. Three young men were torturing the young man and, at last, they killed him by smashing his head with a twenty-kilogram stone. All three members of the event – Alexey Burkov, Anton Smolin and Pavel Semikin – were arrested. According to recognition of one of them, the murder took part based on hatred to homosexuals. Closed trial under arrested started at December, 2013.

Case review 

The body of 23-year-old Vladislav Tornovoy was found at around 7 am on 10 May 2013, with extensive injuries, including to his genitals, in the yard of a building on Rossiiskaya Street in the Krasnoarmeisky district of Volgograd. His head had been extensively damaged, and he had a beer bottle inserted into his anus. The killers also attempted, unsuccessfully, to burn the body.  It was determined by the forensics investigators that he died at around 1am. 

After the victim was identified, his social circle was investigated leading to several potential suspects. These included: a 22-year-old friend of the victim, that went to the same school; and a 27-year-old acquaintance, who had been previously convicted for theft. Another young man was identified as an eye witness to the slaying. Of the two suspects, only one of admitted to the crime. 

The three identified people who either participated or witnessed the slaying were Vladislav Tornovoy’s closest friends, and had visited his house on many separate occasions. Of the three men, one had a previous jail sentence, and another had been placed on probation for separate crimes. The investigation showed that each of the detained men had committed homophobic crimes before.

Investigation and court

Investigator’s comments 

According to investigator Badma Gilyandikov’s version, reason of the murder was personal dislike. As senior investigator of District Investigative Division SC SC in the region Andrey Gapchenko said, that motive for committing the crime was information of the homosexuality of the killed man. However, Gapchenko pointed that this information had not been checked and it would never be checked. During an interview with RIA Novosti Gapchenko said, that according to words of one suspect, Tornovoy came out to his friends while drinking alcohol, and as a joke other guys wanted to undress him to send him home without clothes, but the joke went too far. At the same time Gapchenko said, that investigation considers other versions of motive of the murder, but they all are secrecy of investigation.

The court session 
The court session of the case of Vladislav Tornovoy murder started at December, 2013 and it took place behind closed doors in Volgograd countryside justice. According to press secretary of Volgograd countryside justice Vladimir Shevchenko the court session is close, because of “discussion of private life of the victim”. At last court session decision was made to send three suspect to Moscow Institute of Serbsky for psychiatric examinations. Sessions will continue after examinations proceed. Tornovoy family ignores the court session, and lawyers refuse to comment. There are no press releases.

References

External links 
 
 
 
 

LGBT in Russia
Events in Volgograd
Murder in Russia
2013 murders in Russia
2013 in LGBT history
May 2013 events in Russia
Criminal cases in Russia
Violence against gay men
Violence against men in Europe